Canada (Citizenship and Immigration) v. Khosa, 2009 SCC 12, is a leading Supreme Court of Canada decision in Canadian administrative law.

Facts
Khosa was a citizen of India who immigrated to Canada with his family in 1996 at the age of 14. He was found guilty in 2002 of criminal negligence causing death and sentenced to a conditional sentence of two years less a day. A removal order was issued for him to return to India.

Judicial History
Khosa appealed the order to the Immigration Appeal Division (IAD) of the Immigration and Refugee Board. The majority of the IAD denied Khosa "special relief" on humanitarian and compassionate grounds. On appeal, the Federal Court reviewed the assessment of the IAD and found it to be reasonable. That decision was then appealed to the Federal Court of Appeal which then found that the decision had not been reasonable when they denied relief and set the decision aside.

Opinion of the court
Binnie J. wrote for the majority, who found that s. 18.1 of the Federal Courts Act set out the threshold grounds which permit but do not require the court to grant relief when conducting judicial review. Binnie J. held that "whether or not the court should exercise its discretion in favour of the application will depend on the court's appreciation of the respective roles of the courts and the administration as well as the "circumstances in each case".

Applying the reasonableness standard from Dunsmuir v. New Brunswick, Binnie J. held that courts should be deferential to the IAD decisions and should not substitute its own findings. In the result, he found that the IAD decision was reasonable and restored its order.

Dissenting opinion
Fish J. dissented, agreeing with the Court of Appeal that the decision was unreasonable on account of the IAD's emphasis on the specific fact that Khosa denied having engaged in street-racing, and would have granted a re-hearing in the IAD, concluding, "I agree that decisions of the IAD are entitled to deference.  In my respectful view, however, deference ends where unreasonableness begins."

See also
 Suresh v. Canada (Minister of Citizenship and Immigration), 2002 SCC 1
 Ahani v. Canada (Minister of Citizenship and Immigration), 2002 SCC 2
 Baker v. Canada (Minister of Citizenship and Immigration), [1999] 2 SCR 817
 List of Supreme Court of Canada cases

Notes

External links
 

Canadian administrative case law
Canadian immigration and refugee case law
2009 in Canadian case law